Acrognophos is a genus of moths in the family Geometridae described by Wiltshire in 1967.

Species
Acrognophos iveni (Erschoff, 1874)

References

Gnophini
Geometridae genera